Kálmán Szabó (born 27 June 1980 in Budapest) is a Hungarian football retired goalkeeper

External links
Profile hlsz.hu

1980 births
Living people
Hungarian footballers
Ferencvárosi TC footballers
Association football goalkeepers
Footballers from Budapest